The Asellidae are a family of isopod crustaceans, one of the largest families of freshwater isopods, living in both epigean and hypogean habitats in North America and Europe. The family includes these genera:

Asellus Geoffroy, 1762
Baicalasellus Stammer, 1932
Bragasellus Henry & Magniez, 1968
Caecidotea Packard, 1871
Calasellus Bowman, 1981
Chthonasellus Argano & Messana, 1991
Columbasellus Lewis, Martin & Wetzer, 2003
Gallasellus
Lirceolus Bowman & Longley, 1976
Lirceus Rafinesque-Schmaltz, 1820
Mancasellus Harger, 1876
Nipponasellus Matsumoto, 1962
Phreatoasellus Matsumoto, 1962
Phreatosasellus Matsomoto, 1962
Proasellus Dudich, 1925
Psammasellus Braga, 1968
Remasellus Bowman & Sket, 1985
Salmasellus Bowman, 1975
Sibirasellus Henry & Magniez, 1993
Stygasellus Chappuis, 1943
Synasellus Braga, 1944
Uenasellus Matsumoto, 1962

References

External links

Asellota
Freshwater crustaceans
Crustacean families